Drout is a surname. Notable people with the surname include:

Michael D. C. Drout (born 1968), American academic and author
John Drout (fl. 1570), English poet